Kiss Me Before the Light Changes is the eleventh studio album released by American musical group Kid Creole and the Coconuts. It was the second of two albums released by the group in 1995.

Track listing

References

1995 albums
Kid Creole and the Coconuts albums